The flathead catfish (Pylodictis olivaris), also called by several common names including mudcat or shovelhead cat, is a large species of North American freshwater catfish in the family Ictaluridae. It is the only species of the genus Pylodictis. Ranging from the lower Great Lakes region to northern Mexico, it has been widely introduced and is an invasive species in some areas.  The closest living relative of the flathead catfish is the much smaller widemouth blindcat, Satan eurystomus.

Common names
The flathead catfish is also known as the yellow cat, mud cat, Johnnie cat, goujon, appaluchion, opelousas, pied cat and Mississippi cat.<ref>[https://tpwd.texas.gov/huntwild/wild/species/catfish/ Texas.gov: Other names]- Retrieved 2017-11-17</ref>  In dialect of the Ozark mountains it may be referred to as a "granny cat."

Description
The flathead catfish is olive colored on its sides and dorsum, with a white to yellow underside. Individuals, particularly young specimens from clearer waters, may be strongly mottled with dark brown to black color.  The eyes are small and the lower jaw prominently projects beneath the upper.  A premaxillary tooth pad has posterior extensions.  The caudal fin is emarginate in structure, and its upper lobe may bear an isolated white margin. The fins are otherwise brown, though the body's mottling may extend into the fins.  The anal fin has 14 to 17 rays and a round margin.

Its maximum recorded lifespan is 28 years. However, a record from 1982, caught by "other methods", shows that the flathead catfish could be North America's longest species of catfish, after a specimen pulled from the Arkansas River measured 175 cm (69 in.) and weighed 63.45 kg (139 lbs and 14oz.).

Distribution and habitat
The native range of the flathead catfish includes a broad area west of the Appalachian Mountains encompassing large rivers of the Mississippi, Missouri, and Ohio basins. The range extends as far north as Canada, as far west as Texas, and south to the Gulf of Mexico including northeastern Mexico.
The flathead catfish cannot live in full-strength seawater (which is about 35 parts per thousand or about 35 grams of salt per liter of water), but it can survive in 10 ppt for a while and thrive in up to about 5 ppt.

Diet
The flathead catfish prefers live prey. It is a voracious carnivore and feeds primarily on fishes, insects, annelid worms, and crustaceans. It also feeds on other small catfish and almost anything that moves and makes vibration. They are known to eat crayfish, American gizzard shad (Dorosoma cepedianum), insects and larvae, channel catfish (Ictalurus punctatus), drum (Aplodinotus grunniens), other flatheads, green sunfish (Lepomis cyanellus), and carp. Insect larvae are the major prey type until an individual reaches approximately 100 mm (3.9 in) in total length, at which point the diet expands to include crayfish and small fishes. Individuals above 250 mm (9.8 in) in length feed almost exclusively on other fish.

Breeding
Spawning of P. olivaris'' occurs in late June and early July, and the nests are made in areas with submerged logs and other debris. The males, which also build the nests, fiercely and tirelessly defend and fan the clutch. The size of the clutch varies proportionately to the size of the female; an average of 2,640 eggs per kilogram of fish are laid.

The fry frequent shallow areas with rocky and sandy substrates, where they feed on insects and worms such as annelids and polychaetes. Young flathead catfish are also cannibalistic, which has largely precluded their presence in aquaculture.

Relationship with humans
Inhabiting deep pools, lakes, and large, slow-moving rivers, the flathead catfish is popular among anglers; its flesh is widely regarded as the tastiest of the catfishes. Its size also makes the flathead catfish an effective subject of public aquaria.

Sport fishing 

Sport fishing for flathead catfish using either rod and reel, limb lines, or bare hands (noodling) can be an exciting pastime. Anglers target this species in a variety of waterways, including small rivers (barely large enough for a canoe), large rivers (such as the Missouri, Mississippi, Ohio, Tennessee and Colorado Rivers), and reservoirs. A common element of flathead catfish location is submerged wood cover such as logs and rootwads which often collect at bends in rivers. A good flathead spot usually also includes relatively deep water compared to the rest of a particular section of river, a moderate amount of current, and access to plentiful baitfish such as river herring, shad, carp, drum, panfish, or suckers.

See also
List of fish common names

References

External links

Species Profile - Flathead Catfish (Pylodictis olivaris), National Invasive Species Information Center, United States National Agricultural Library. Lists general information and resources for Flathead Catfish.

flathead catfish
Freshwater fish of the United States
flathead catfish
flathead catfish